Josef Přibyl may refer to:
 Josef Přibyl (wrestler), Czech wrestler
 Josef Přibyl (chess player), Czech chess player